Events from the year 1329 in Ireland.

Incumbent
Lord: Edward III

Events
 June 10 – Braganstown massacre, County Louth: over 160 killed.
 August 10 - The battle of Ardnocher took place near Horseleap between the forces of Thomas Butler and William Mac Geoghegan. Mac Geoghegan forces won and Butler and many of his soldiers were killed.

Births

Deaths
 June 10 – Maol Ruanaidh Cam Ó Cearbhaill, tiompan musician, in Braganstown massacre.

References
"The Annals of Ireland by Friar John Clyn", edited and translated with an Introduction, by Bernadette Williams, Four Courts Press, 2007. , pp. 240–244.
"A New History of Ireland VIII: A Chronology of Irish History to 1976", edited by T. W. Moody, F.X. Martin and F.J. Byrne. Oxford, 1982. .
http://www.ucc.ie/celt/published/T100001B/index.html
http://www.ucc.ie/celt/published/T100005C/index.html
http://www.ucc.ie/celt/published/T100010B/index.html
 F.Lydon, James (1977). Journal of the County Louth Archaeological and Historical Society, Volume 19, No.1. Journal of the County Louth Archaeological and History Society. pp. 5–10. 

 
1320s in Ireland
Ireland
 Years of the 14th century in Ireland